The International Mathematical Contest in Modeling (MCM) is a multi-day mathematical modelling competition held annually in USA, during the first or second weekend in February, since 1985 by COMAP and sponsored by SIAM and INFORMS. It is distinguished from other major mathematical competitions such as the famous Putnam Competition by its strong focus on research, modeling skills, mathematics, originality, teamwork, communication and justification of results. It runs concurrently with the Interdisciplinary Contest in Modeling (ICM).

The International Mathematical Contest in Modeling is one of the most prestigious mathematical competitions in the world. The financial support initially provided by Science Foundations like National Science Foundation (NSF), Institute for Operations Research and the Management Sciences (INFORMS), High Society for Industrial and Applied Mathematics (SIAM), since 2004 additional funding comes from the National Security Agency of USA (NSA) and Mathematical Association of America (MAA).

Problems 
At the beginning of the contest, teams have a choice between two problems. Problem A involves a system that requires the use of continuous mathematics, and thus often involves concepts from geometry, physics, or engineering.  Problem B involves a system that requires the use of discrete mathematics. In 2016, a "data insights" problem was added, where teams are given access to database files and tasked with using them to answer a question. This problem was designated as Problem C, though previously, Problem C referred to an ICM problem. These problems tend to be open-ended, and are drawn from all fields of science, business, and public policy. Past problems include
 Estimate the global effects of a large asteroid impacting Antarctica (1999 A)
 Study the hunting strategies of velociraptor dinosaurs based on fossil data (1997 A)
 Develop a more efficient method of boarding passengers onto large commercial jets (2007 B)
Teams have 96 hours to research and submit their solutions in the form of a research paper. During this time, they may consult any available references, but may not discuss their problem with anyone outside their teams. Several guides containing advice and recommendations for teams and/or advisors have been published online or in print.

Participation and awards 
Thousands of international teams of three undergraduates compete to produce original mathematical papers in response to one of two modelling problems. Initially, participation was largely from the United States, however, in recent years international participation has grown significantly, particularly from the People's Republic of China, so that in 2007 teams from the United States comprised only 24% of total participation. In 2014, the percentage of teams from the People's Republic of China reached a record high of 92.9%.

After the competition, all papers are judged and placed into the following categories:
 Unsuccessful Participant
 Successful Participant (approximately 65% of teams)
 Honorable Mention (approximately 21% of teams)
 Meritorious Winner (approximately 8% of teams)
 Outstanding Winner and Finalist (approximately 1.5% of teams)

Until 2009, Outstanding Winner papers were published in The UMAP Journal.

Results

2015 
 7636 teams participated
 Problem A Outstanding  Winners
 Northwestern Polytechnical University, China
 State University of New York, University at Buffalo, NY — MAA Prize Recipient
 Chongqing University, China — SIAM Prize Recipient
 Central South University, China — Ben Fusaro Award
 University of Adelaide, Australia — INFORMS Prize Recipient
 Problem B Outstanding Winners
 University of Colorado Boulder, CO — SIAM Prize Recipient & Two Sigma Scholarship Award
 Bethel University, MN — MAA Prize Recipient & Frank Giordano Award
 University of Colorado Boulder, CO
 Colorado College, CO — INFORMS Prize Recipient
 Tsinghua University, China

2014 
 6755 teams participated
 Problem A Outstanding Winners
 Shanghai Jiaotong University, China
 Tsinghua University, China — INFORMS & Ben Fusaro Award
 Nanjing University, China
 Zhejiang University, China— SIAM Prize Recipient
 Beijing Normal University, China
 Tufts University, MA — MAA Prize Recipient
 Problem B Outstanding Winners
 Chongqing University, China
 University of International Business and Economics, China
 Southeast University, China
 Huazhong University of Science and Technology, China — Frank Giordano Award
 Southwest University for Nationalities, China — SIAM Prize Recipient
 College of Information Science and Engineering; Northeastern University, China
 NC School of Science and Mathematics, NC — INFORMS & MAA Prize Recipient

2013 
 5636 teams participated
 Problem A Outstanding Winners
 Bethel University, MN — MAA Prize Recipient
 Fudan University, China
 Peking University, China
 Shandong University, China — INFORMS Prize Recipient
 Shanghai Jiaotong University, China
 University of Colorado Boulder, CO — SIAM Prize Recipient
 Tongji University, China — Ben Fusaro Award (Finalist)
 Problem B Outstanding Winners
 Beijing Univ. of Posts and Telecomm, China
 Colorado College, CO — Frank Giordano Award
 Nanjing University, China — INFORMS Prize Recipient
 Tsinghua University, China — SIAM Prize Recipient
 University of Colorado Boulder, CO — MAA Prize Recipient

2012
 3697 teams participated
 Problem A Outstanding Winners
 Hong Kong Baptist University, Hong Kong
 National University of Singapore, Singapore — Ben Fusaro Award
 Shanghai Foreign Language School, China — INFORMS Prize Recipient
 Zhejiang University, China — SIAM Prize Recipient
 Cornell University, NY — MAA Prize Recipient (Finalist)
 Problem B Outstanding Winners
 Bethel University, MN
 Peking University, China
 University of Colorado, CO — MAA Prize Recipient
 University of Colorado, CO — INFORMS Prize Recipient
 University of Louisville, KY — SIAM Prize Recipient
 Western Washington University, WA — Frank Giordano Award

2011
 2775 teams participated
 Problem A Outstanding Winners
 Eastern Oregon University, OR — MAA Prize Recipient
 Peking University, China
 Tsinghua University, China —SIAM Prize Recipient
 University of Western Ontario, Canada — INFORMS Prize Recipient & Ben Fusaro Award
 Problem B Outstanding Winners
 Harvey Mudd College, CA — SIAM Prize Recipient
 Rensselaer Polytechnic Institute, NY
 University of Electronic Science and Technology, China — INFORMS Prize Recipient & Ben Fusaro Award
 Virginia Tech, VA — MAA Prize Recipient

See also 
 Interdisciplinary Contest in Modeling
 International Mathematical Modeling Challenge

References

External links 
 Official contest website
 

Mathematics competitions
Recurring events established in 1985
1985 establishments in the United States